The Nice Lawn Tennis Club is a tennis complex in Nice, France.  It is the home venue of the ATP World Tour's Nice Open as of 2010.

History
The complex opened in 1890. It is located at 5 Avenue Suzanne Lenglen. The club is home to 18 clay courts, including a center court stadium.

From 1895 to 1970 the club hosted the South of France Championships for men and ended in 1971 for women.

In 1997, the tennis club hosted a Fed Cup semifinals tie between France and Belgium.

Notable tournaments
 Nice LTC Winter Cup
 Nice Lawn Tennis Club Championships 
 Open de Nice Côte d'Azur
 South of France Championships

External links
Nice Lawn Tennis Club

Tennis venues in France
Sport in Nice
Sports venues in Alpes-Maritimes
Buildings and structures in Nice
Sports venues completed in 1890
Tennis clubs